is a Japanese tokusatsu erotic-comedy film based in some works of Go Nagai. Directed by Minoru Kawasaki, it was produced and distributed by Total Media Corporation (TMC), and released in 2004. The movie draws several elements from many works of Nagai, most prominently the characters Maboroshi Panty and Henchin Pokoider, but some others are also featured in the film such as Satan no Ashi no Tsume from Kekko Kamen.

External links
Official website  at TMC
Nagai Go World: Maboroshi Panty VS Henchin Pokoider  at allcinema
Nagai Go World: Maboroshi Panty VS Henchin Pokoider  at the Japanese Movie Database
Nagai Go World: Maboroshi Panty VS Henchin Pokoider at Superheroes Lives website

Tokusatsu films
2004 films
2000s sex comedy films
Erotic fantasy films
Go Nagai
2000s Japanese-language films
Japanese sex comedy films
2004 comedy films
2000s Japanese films